Dixinn  is an urban sub-prefecture in the Conakry Region of Guinea and one of five in the capital Conakry. As of 2014 it had a population of 137,287 people.

The University of Conakry is located in Dixinn.

References

Sub-prefectures of Conakry